Hamilton Southeastern High School (HSE or HSHS) is a public secondary school in Fishers, Indiana, United States. It is a part of the Hamilton Southeastern School District.

History
During the 2003–2004 school year, the Hamilton Southeastern school district opened the Hamilton Southeastern High School Freshman Campus, which would house the district's high school freshmen until the 2006–2007 school year. In the fall of 2006, the HSE Freshman Campus became the second high school in the HSE school district, Fishers High School. In summer 2009, the cafeteria was expanded to accommodate more students.

A new cafeteria and hallway replaced much of the original HSE High School courtyard in the summer of 2010. The addition was part of a $1.5 million project to combat overcrowding and help ease foot traffic.

In 2012, freshmen were put into a Freshman Campus at the location of the old junior high until the senior wing addition, which opened for the 2015–2016 school year, was complete. The Freshman Campus then became Fall Creek Junior High School.

Beginning with the 2015–2016 school year, the newly built College and Career Academy was opened for students.

Academics
Hamilton Southeastern High School became a National Blue Ribbon School for 2004–2005, being in the top 4% of schools nationwide.

Notable people
Alumni
 Randy Gregory - NFL defensive end  for the Denver Broncos
 Gary Harris - NBA player for the Orlando Magic
 Zak Irvin - former Michigan Wolverines men's basketball player
 Joe Reitz - NFL offensive tackle for the Indianapolis Colts; former offensive tackle for the Miami Dolphins and Baltimore Ravens
 Chris Summers - former placekicker and punter for Purdue Boilermakers football (2006-2008)

Staff
 John Stollmeyer - former US national soccer team player; head soccer coach at HSE

See also
 List of high schools in Indiana

References

External links
 Hamilton Southeastern High School
 Hamilton Southeastern Schools

Public high schools in Indiana
Educational institutions established in 1963
Schools in Hamilton County, Indiana
1963 establishments in Indiana
Fishers, Indiana